Blue Afternoon is the fourth studio album by Tim Buckley, released in November 1969. It is Tim Buckley's first self-produced record and his debut for Herb Cohen and Frank Zappa's Straight record label. This was Buckley's fourth album after Tim Buckley, Goodbye and Hello, and Happy Sad. Blue Afternoon used the same group of musicians as Happy Sad, with the inclusion of drummer Jimmy Madison.

Several tracks on Blue Afternoon are songs Buckley had intended to record on earlier albums but had not completed. "Chase the Blues Away" and "Happy Time" are numbers he had worked on in the summer of 1968 for possible inclusion on Happy Sad and demos can be heard on the Rhino label's Works in Progress album.

Blue Afternoon, like Starsailor, was re-released as a stand-alone album on CD format only once in the United States, in 1989 on the Enigma Retro label.  It was then later re-issued by Warners/Rhino Records UK in 2011 as part of the 'Original Album Series' box set, with Buckley's four LPs released on Elektra Records, and again in 2017 by Rhino as part of the collection Tim Buckley - The Complete Album Collection, featuring his first 7 albums plus a re-release of Works in Progress.

Track listing
All tracks are written by Tim Buckley.

Personnel
 Tim Buckley – 12-string guitar, vocals
 Lee Underwood – guitar, piano
 Steve Khan – guitar on "Happy Time" and "So Lonely"
 David Friedman – vibraphone
 John Miller – acoustic and electric bass
 Jimmy Madison – drums
 Carter C.C. Collins – congas on "Blue Melody"
Technical
Dick Kunc - engineer, technical production
John Williams - design, photography
Frank Bez - photography

References

External links 
Review of Blue Afternoon and Starsailor in Rolling Stone
Review of Blue Afternoon by Don Heckman in The New York Times

Tim Buckley albums
1969 albums
Straight Records albums
Enigma Records albums
Albums produced by Tim Buckley